Luigi Cinque Tarantula Hypertext Orchestra are an avant garde Italian music group prominent in world music. The Orchestra has recorded since 1974. The leader, Luigi Cinque, has also written about Italian folk and popular music.

Italian musical groups